Newar Muslims are Newar people who practice Islam, living in the Kathmandu Valley.

History
Newar Muslims are descended from Newars that converted to Islam sometime in the past.

References

Islam in Nepal
Newar
Newar religion